Rodoni may refer to:
 Cape of Rodon, in Albania
 Castle of Rodon, in Albania